Marshall S. Pike (May 20, 1818 – February 13, 1901) was an American songwriter and poet. He was known for his song "Home Again" published in 1850. He wrote lyrics in collaboration with James Pierpont for the song "The Little White Cottage" or "Gentle Nettie Moore" published by Oliver Ditson and Company, and copyrighted on September 16, 1857. The songwriting credit appeared as: "Poetry by Marshall S. Pike, Esq."

Life and career

Marshall Spring Pike was born on May 20, 1818 in Westborough, Massachusetts. He began to write music and verses at 14 years old. In 1843 he formed a quartet with John Powers, James Powers, and L.V.H Crosby called the "Albino Family".

Mr. Pike served in the American Civil War as Drum Major of the 22nd Massachusetts Volunteer Infantry for three years and was discharged in 1862. He was taken prisoner at the Battle of Gaines' Mill and sent to Libby Prison, where he formed a Glee Club to entertain fellow prisoners.

After the war he toured New England as a member of the Pike and Glunn Combination.

Bob Dylan based his 2006 song "Nettie Moore" from the Modern Times album on his 1857 composition "Gentle Nettie Moore". The 1857 song is about a man pining for a girl sold into slavery, shackled with chains, and taken away from the little white cottage as a slave laborer. 

The Sons of the Pioneers with Roy Rogers released a recording of "Gentle Nettie Moore" in 1934.

Compositions
 "Harmoneons Carolina Melodies", 1840
 "Oh Give Me a Home if in Foreign Land", 1845
 "Home Again", 1850
 "The Lone Starry Hours. Serenade", 1850
 "Happy Are We Tonight", 1850
 "Gentle Nettie Moore", with James Lord Pierpont, 1857
 "Rocklawn Summer Wildwood. Song", 1862

References

External links
"Gentle Nettie Moore or The Little White Cottage" (1857). University of Tennessee, Knoxville. Libraries. Digital Collections. Retrieved 16 December 2022.

1818 births
1901 deaths
19th-century American poets
American male poets
People from Westborough, Massachusetts
Songwriters from Massachusetts
Union Army soldiers
19th-century American male writers